Kosana or Košana may refer to:

 George Kosana, American actor and steel worker
 Dolnja Košana, a Slovenian village
 Gornja Košana, a Slovenian village